The  was held on 10 February 1991 in Kannai Hall, Yokohama, Kanagawa, Japan.

Awards
 Best Film: Sakura no Sono
 Best Actor: Masato Furuoya – Uchū no hōsoku
 Best Actress: Yuki Saito – Hong Kong Paradise
 Best New Actress:
Saki Takaoka – Batāshi Kingyo
Hiroko Nakajima – Sakura no Sono
Riho Makise – Tugumi, Tōkyō Jōkū Irasshaimase
 Best Supporting Actor: Keizo Kanie – Ware ni utsu yoi ari, Boku to, bokura no natsu
 Best Supporting Actress: Tomoko Nakajima – Tugumi
 Best Director: Shun Nakahara – Sakura no Sono
 Best New Director: Joji Matsuoka – Batāshi Kingyo
 Best Screenplay: Hiroaki Jinno – Sakura no Sono
 Best Cinematography: Norimichi Kasamatsu – Batāshi Kingyo, Tekken
 Best Music Score: Shigeru Umebayashi – Tekken
 Special Prize:
Yoshio Harada (Career)
Kōji Wakamatsu (Career)

Best 10
 Sakura no Sono
 Ware ni Utsu Yōi Ari
 Batāshi Kingyo
 Boiling Point
 Tekken
 Tugumi
 Uchū no hōsoku
 Tenamonya Connection
 Saraba Itoshi no Yakuza
 Hong Kong Paradise
runner-up. Childhood Days

References

Yokohama Film Festival
Yokohama Film Festival 
Yokohama Film Festival 
Yoko
Yokohama Film Festival